Portuguese pavement, known in Portuguese as calçada portuguesa or simply calçada is a traditional-style pavement used for many pedestrian areas in Portugal. It consists of small flat pieces of stones arranged in a pattern or image, like a mosaic. It can also be found in Olivença (a disputed territory administered by Spain) and throughout former Portuguese colonies. Portuguese workers are also hired for their skill in creating these pavements in places such as Gibraltar. Being usually used in sidewalks, it is in town squares and atriums that this art finds its deepest expression.

One of the most distinctive uses of this paving technique is the image of Saint-Queen Elizabeth of Portugal, (Santa Rainha Isabel) in Coimbra, designed with black and white stones of basalt and limestone.

Origins

Paving as a craft is believed to have originated in Mesopotamia, where rocky materials were used in the inside and outside of constructions, being later brought to Ancient Greece and Ancient Rome.

The Romans used to pave the vias connecting the empire using materials to be found in the surroundings. Some of the Roman techniques introduced then are still applied on the calçada, most noticeably the use of a foundation and a surfacing.

Future

Very little new paving of this type is done, and the entire profession is at risk. The long hours and low wages typical of calceteiros have reduced apprenticeships and thus new pavers. Furthermore, as the pavement is less safe (provides less traction when wet; loose stones can become tripping hazards), costs more (especially with the difficulty of obtaining appropriate stones), and wears quicker than concrete or asphalt, there is also dropping interest in investment and construction in it. Although there were once hundreds of calceteiros, most modern work is on conservation or major architectural projects.

While São Paulo is currently replacing the Portuguese pavement sidewalks of Paulista Avenue with a cheaper type of pavement, other Brazilian cities such as Rio de Janeiro still have nearly ubiquitous Portuguese pavement, particularly in more affluent areas. It can also be found around the building of Asunción Super Centro, Asunción, Paraguay.

Setting the stones
Craftsmen lay a bedding of gravel upon a well-compacted trench of argillaceous materials, which accommodates the tessera stones, acting as a cement.

Calçada as a form of art

See also
 Sett (paving)
 Mosaic
 Terrazzo
 Engineered stone

References

External links

Paving in Portuguese, urbanphoto.net
Portuguese pavement and its histories (Portuguese language)
The Portuguese Pavements Handbook (10 MB), Direccção Nacional de Energia e Geologia (Portuguese/English)

Pavements
Mosaics
Stonemasonry
Architecture in Portugal
Garden features
Street furniture
Footpaths
Portuguese traditions